Jonas Lüscher (born 22 October 1976 in Schlieren) is a Swiss-German writer and essayist.

Early life 
Lüscher grew up in Bern where he later trained between 1994 and 1998 at the Muristalden Evangelical Teacher Training School (Evangelische Lehrerseminar Muristalden) to qualify as a primary school teacher.

Career 
He spent a few years as a script editor and screenwriter for the Munich film industry. He then undertook studies at the Munich School of Philosophy from 2005 to 2009, earning a master's degree in 2009. At the same time he was working as a freelance editor.

From 2009–2001 Lüscher researched ethics in science at the TTN Institute (Institut Technik-Theologie-Naturwissenschaften) at the Ludwig Maximilian University of Munich.

In 2011 Lüscher moved to the Swiss Federal Institute of Technology Zürich  (Eidgenössische Technische Hochschule Zürich or ETH). There he embarked on a dissertation under the supervision of philosopher Michael Hampe on the work of Richard Rorty. In 2012–13 Lüscher was awarded a grant by the Swiss Government enabling him to spend nine months as Visiting Researcher in the Comparative Literature Department at Stanford University. At the end of 2014 Lüscher left ETH without completing his dissertation.

Lüscher is a member of the PEN Centre Germany and began living in Munich in 2001.

His first novel, Frühling der Barbaren (Barbarian Spring, translated by Peter Lewis) was nominated in 2013 for both the Swiss Book Prize and the German Book Prize.

Selected works
 Jetzt. Libretto for the Opera by Mathis Nitschke, original production at the  Opéra National de Montpellier, 30 November 2012.
 Frühling der Barbaren. Novella. C.H. Beck, München 2013.  translated by Peter Lewis as Barbarian Spring, Haus Publishing, London 2014. 
 Kraft. Novel. C.H. Beck, München 2017. , longlisted for the 2017 German Book Prize. Translated by Tess Lewis as Kraft, Farrar, Straus and Giroux, New York, 2020.

Awards 
 2013: Franz-Hessel-Preis for Frühling der Barbaren
 2013: Literary Award of Kanton Bern
 2013: Bayerischer Kunstförderpreis
 2016: Hans Fallada Prize for Frühling der Barbaren
 2017: Schweizer Buchpreis (Swiss Book Award) for Kraft
 2022: Max Frisch Prize

Literature 
 Stefan Hofer-Krucker Valderrama: Die perpetuierte Katastrophe. Globalisierung und ihre Schattenseiten in Jonas Lüschers „Frühling der Barbaren“. Mit einigen literaturdidaktischen Anmerkungen. In: Almut Hille, Sabine Jambon, Marita Meyer (Eds.): Globalisierung – Natur – Zukunft erzählen. Aktuelle deutschsprachige Literatur für die Internationale Germanistik und das Fach Deutsch als Fremdsprache. München 2015, pp. 39–57.
 
 Yvonne Hütter: Ethics and Aesthetics in Jonas Lüscher’s „Barbarian Spring“. In: Primerjalna književnost, No. 40.2, 2017, S. 149–163.

References

External links 

 Literature by and about Jonas Lüscher in the Catalogue of the German National Library
 Jonas Lüscher at C.H. Beck
 Jonas Lüscher at literaturhaus:basel

1976 births
21st-century Swiss writers
Living people
Swiss Book Prize winners